John Moore is an Australian actor. He has played lead roles in the films The Life of Harry Dare, and Blackfellas. He was nominated for the AFI Award for Best Actor in a Leading Role in 1993, for Blackfellas, and in 1995, for The Life Of Harry Dare, and was nominated for the AFI Award for Best Actor in a Supporting Role in 1991 for Deadly. He was also nominated for the 2013 AFI Award for Open Craft Award in a Non-feature Film for his acting in the short film Cold Turkey.
 
Other roles include Pitch Black, Home and Away and the original stage production of Bran Nue Dae.

References

External links
 

Living people
Australian male film actors
Indigenous Australian male actors
Year of birth missing (living people)